Patrick Bornhauser (born 29 June 1957 in Orléans) is a French racing driver and businessman. In 2011 and 2012 he won the GTE-Am class at the 24 Hours of Le Mans.

Racing career
Bornhauser started competing in hillclimbing and then rallying. In 1994 he started circuit racing in the Peugeot 905 Spider Cup, finishing fifth.

From 1995 he raced the VBM 400 GTC (VBM stood for Vehicles Bornhauser-Metz, started by Bornhauser and fellow driver Jean-François Metz), in BPR Global GT Series races in 1995–96 and then in French GT until 2001.

Bornhauser switched to a Porsche for 2002, and then to a Chrysler Viper GTS-R in 2004 with which he won his first French GT titles in 2004 and 2005. In 2006 he made his 24 Hours of Le Mans debut in a Larbre Competition Ferrari 550 Maranello. The following year he raced an Aston Martin DBR9 for Larbre.

In 2008 he won the French GT title for a third time after sharing a Larbre-run Saleen S7 with Christophe Bouchut, which they also raced at Le Mans. Bornhauser regained the French GT title in 2010 in a Larbre-run Porsche together with Laurent Groppi.

After two years away, Bornhauser returned to Le Mans in 2011 and won the GTE-Am class in a Chevrolet Corvette C6.R entered by Larbre. He repeated the feat with the same team and car in 2012.

Business
Bornhauser is the Group CEO of French moving company Demeco.

24 Hours of Le Mans results

References

External links

1957 births
Living people
Sportspeople from Orléans
French racing drivers
FIA GT Championship drivers
European Le Mans Series drivers
American Le Mans Series drivers
24 Hours of Le Mans drivers
French chief executives
FIA World Endurance Championship drivers
French people of German descent
Aston Martin Racing drivers
Larbre Compétition drivers